Dzhanik Habibullaevich Fayziev (born July 30, 1961) is an Uzbek and Russian director, producer and screenwriter. He specializes in historical adventure movies. Most notably, he directed The Turkish Gambit and Legend of Kolovrat, and produced Admiral.

Filmography

As director
 Old Songs of the Main Things 2 (1997)
 Namedni 1961-2003: Nasha Era (1997)
 Russian Еmpire (2000)
 Request Stop (2000)
 The Turkish Gambit (2005)
 August Eighth (2012)
 Furious (2017)
 Goalkeeper of the Galaxy (2020)

As producer
 Old Songs of the Main Things 2 (1997)
 Ice Age (2002)
 Russians in the City of Angels (2013)
 Admiral (2008)
 Desantura (2009)
 High Security Vacation (2009)
 Love Undercover (2010)
 August Eighth (2012)
 Furious (2017)
 Rebellion (2017)
 Krepost Badaber (2018)
 Rubezh (2018)
 Mermaid: The Lake of the Dead (2018)
 Goalkeeper of the Galaxy (2020)

As screenwriter
 Old Songs of the Main Things 2 (1997)
 August Eighth (2012)
 Goalkeeper of the Galaxy (2020)

Personal views
In March 2014, he signed an appeal of Russian cultural figures in support of President Putin's policy on Ukraine and Crimea.

References

External links

 Режиссёр Джаник Файзиев о катарсисе в коммерческом кино

Living people
1961 births
Russian film directors
Russian film producers
Russian people of Uzbekistani descent
Uzbekistani emigrants to Russia
Russian screenwriters
State Prize of the Russian Federation laureates
Gerasimov Institute of Cinematography alumni
Uzbekistani film directors